Upp is the debut self-titled album by British rock/jazz fusion band Upp, which was released in 1975. The album was recorded at Escape Studios, Kent. The opening track, "Bad Stuff," showcases charismatic guitar playing by Jeff Beck. There is a strong influence of funk music is felt in the tracks "Get Down in the Dirt," "Friendly Street," and "Give It to You." Jeff Beck produced and played guitars on this album with no mention of him in the album's liner notes, which met with some controversy. "Give it to you" contains one of the most-sampled breakbeats of all time, and is featured in the Ultimate Breaks and Beats series.

Track listing

 "Bad Stuff" (Clark, Copley, Field)
 "Friendly Street" (Clark, Copley, Field)
 "It's a Mystery" (Clark, Copley, Field)
 "Get Down in the Dirt" (Clark, Copley, Field)
 "Give It to You" (Clark, Copley, Field)
 "Jeff's One" (Beck, Clark)
 "Count to Ten" (Clark, Copley, Field)

Personnel

Andy Clark - Keyboards (Fender Rhodes Electric Piano, Minimoog Synthesizer, Mellotron, and Hohner Clavinet D6)
Stephen Amazing - Bass
Jim Copley - Drums
Jeff Beck - Guitars

Arranged by Upp
Produced by Jeff Beck

References

1975 debut albums
Upp (band) albums
Epic Records albums